The second HMS Redmill (K554), and first ship to see service under the name, was a British Captain-class frigate of the Royal Navy in commission during World War II. Originally constructed as a United States Navy Buckley class destroyer escort, she served in the Royal Navy from 1943 to 1945.

Construction and transfer
The ship was laid down as the unnamed U.S. Navy destroyer escort DE-89 by Bethlehem-Hingham Shipyard, Inc., in Hingham, Massachusetts, on 14 July 1943 and launched on 2 October 1943, sponsored by Mrs. James E. Hamilton, the wife of Captain James E. Hamilton of the U.S. Navys Bureau of Ships. The ship was transferred to the United Kingdom upon completion on 30 November 1943.

Service history

Commissioned into service in the Royal Navy as the frigate HMS Redmill (K554) on 30 November 1943 simultaneously with her transfer, the ship served on patrol and escort duty.

On 27 April 1945, the German submarine U-1105 detected three British frigates in the North Atlantic 25 nautical miles (46 km) west of County Mayo, Ireland, and fired two G7es – known to the Allies as "GNAT" – torpedoes at them. U-1105 evaded counterattack. Assisted by the British frigate , Redmill managed to remain afloat and was towed to Lisahally, Northern Ireland.

Found to be beyond economical repair, Redmill was declared a constructive total loss. The Royal Navy returned her hulk to U.S. custody on 20 January 1947.

Disposal
The United States sold Redmill on either 30 January 1947 or 4 February 1947 (sources vary) to the Athens Piraeus Electricity Company, Ltd., of Athens, Greece, for scrapping. The U.S. Navy struck Redmill from its Naval Vessel Register on 7 February 1947.

References
 (misspelled "Redmil")
Navsource Online: Destroyer Escort Photo Archive Redmill (DE-89) HMS Redmill (K-554)
uboat.net HMS Redmill (K 554)
uboat.net Ships Hit By U-Boats: HMS Redmill (K 554)
Destroyer Escort Sailors Association DEs for UK
Captain Class Frigate Association HMS Redmill K554 (DE 89)

External links
Photo gallery of HMS Redmill (K554)

 

Captain-class frigates
Buckley-class destroyer escorts
World War II frigates of the United Kingdom
Ships built in Hingham, Massachusetts
1943 ships
Maritime incidents in April 1945